Bárány is a Hungarian surname meaning "lamb". Notable people with the surname include:

 Árpád Bárány
 Imre Bárány (born 1947), Hungarian mathematician
 István Bárány (1907–1995), Hungarian swimmer
 Robert Bárány

See also 
 Bárány's caloric test
 Bárány chair
 Baranyi

Hungarian-language surnames